The 1st Fighter Squadron is an inactive unit of the United States Air Force.  It was most recently based at Tyndall Air Force Base, Florida, where it operated McDonnell Douglas F-15C Eagle aircraft conducting advanced fighter training.

Mission

The 1 FS provided fully qualified F-15 Eagle pilots for worldwide assignment by conducting formal ground, simulator, and flight training.

History

The 1st flew P-47 Thunderbolt aircraft during World War II.  While based on Ie Shima the 1 FS launched Thunderbolts against the Japanese, amassing almost 1,200 combat air patrol, bombing, strafing, and escort missions. During this era, the squadron emblem was "Miss Fury," a 1940s-era comic strip superheroine. The 1 FS was inactivated on 15 October 1946, after the war had ended.

The 1 FS was activated as part of the 413th Fighter-Day Wing on 11 November 1954.  The squadron trained pilots in the F-86 Sabre from 1954 to 1956 and the F-100 Super Sabre from 1956 to 1959.  The 1st operated out of George Air Force Base, California, until it was again inactivated on 15 March 1959, with Lieutenant Colonel Charles E. "Chuck" Yeager as commander.

The squadron was reactivated 1 January 1984, as part of the 325th Tactical Training Wing, at Tyndall Air Force Base, Florida, to train pilots in the F-15 Eagle.

On 17 September 1991, the operations and maintenance functions of the 1st joined to form a combined squadron.  The squadron continued to train F-15 pilots for the combat air forces and received several honors, such as earning the Air Force Maintenance Effectiveness Award for 1998, Nineteenth Air Force Top Operations Squadron of the Year for 1998, and 325th Fighter Wing Fighter Squadron of the Year for 1995, 1997, and 1998.

Other notable accomplishments include receiving the U. S. Air Force Air Flight Safety of the Year award for 2002, as well as recognition for best intelligence mission report. Also, members received by-name recognition during the 2003 Headquarters Air Education and Training Command Operational Readiness Inspection.

The 1st Fighter Squadron was inactivated on 15 December 2006.

Lineage
 Constituted as the 1st Fighter Squadron, Single Engine on 5 October 1944
 Activated on 15 October 1944
 Inactivated on 15 October 1946
 Redesignated 1st Fighter-Day Squadron on 26 August 1954
 Activated on 11 November 1954
 Redesignated 1st Tactical Fighter Squadron on 1 July 1958
 Inactivated on 15 March 1959
 Redesignated 1st Tactical Fighter Training Squadron on 14 October 1983
 Activated on 1 January 1984
 Redesignated 1st Fighter Squadron on 1 November 1991
 Inactivated on 15 December 2006

Assignments
 413th Fighter Group, 5 October 1944 – 15 October 1956
 413th Fighter-Day Group, 11 November 1954
 413th Fighter-Day Wing (later 413th Tactical Fighter Wing), 8 October 1957 – 15 March 1959 (attached to Sixteenth Air Force, 27 June – c. 12 November 1958)
 325th Tactical Training Wing, 1 January 1984
 325th Operations Group, 1 September 1991 – 15 December 2006

Stations
 Seymour Johnson Field, North Carolina, 15 October 1944
 Bluethenthal Field, North Carolina, 9 November 1944 – 7 April 1945
 Ie Shima Airfield, Okinawa, 19 May 1945
 Kadena Air Base, Okinawa, c. 17 November 1945
 Yontan Airfield, Okinawa, 29 January 1946 – 15 October 1946
 George Air Force Base, California, 11 November 1954 – 15 March 1959 (deployed at Morón Air Base, Spain (27 June – c. 12 November 1958)
 Tyndall Air Force Base, Florida, 1 January 1984 – 15 December 2006

Aircraft
P-47 Thunderbolt (1944–1946)
F-86 Sabre (1954–1956)
F-100 Super Sabre (1956–1959)
F-15 Eagle (1984–2006)

References
 Notes

 Citations

Bibliography

See also
1st Helicopter Squadron, redesignated

001
0001
001